The Alexander–Hirschowitz theorem shows that a specific collection of  double points in the  will impose independent types of conditions on homogenous polynomials and the hypersurface of  with many known lists of exceptions. In which case, the classic polynomial interpolation that is located in several variables can be generalized to points that have larger multiplicities.

References 

Mathematical theorems